The Irish Language Association of Australia was formally registered as a legal entity on 7 May 1993 in order to further the use of the Irish language in south-eastern Australia and organise weekly gatherings for conversation or classes in Melbourne, Victoria. The Association also runs a yearly Irish language summer school (Daonscoil Victoria).

The Association had its origins in various Irish language classes run in the inner suburbs of Melbourne in the 1980s, supplemented by an Irish language program broadcast by the Special Broadcasting Service. The demand for regular classes led to the founding of the Association in 1992. Several venues were tried and the Association's business is now done in the Melbourne Celtic Club.

Aims
The chief aims of the Association are to encourage people to learn Irish and to create an Irish-speaking community in Australia.

Its long-term aim is to have the Irish language included as an official subject in the Victorian secondary school curriculum and to encourage the teaching of the language at tertiary level as a unit for a BA in Irish Studies.

Daonscoil Victoria
The first Irish language summer school in Victoria (later called Daonscoil Victoria) was held in November 1995; a New South Wales school having started in January 1993. It was held for many years in January in a forest site close to Bacchus Marsh, and had an average attendance of 50 students, with language classes supplemented by music, dancing and singing.

Gaeltacht Melbourne 
In January 2018, the Daonscoil resumed after a break, moving to an urban setting at International House, a residential college of the University of Melbourne. From 2019 the Daonscoil will be called Gaeltacht Melbourne.

Notes

References
Noone, Val (2012). Hidden Ireland in Victoria. Ballarat Heritage Services. 

Ó Scanláin, Muiris (2009). An Mám ó Dheas. An Sagart.

External links
 Official site of the Association

1993 establishments in Australia
Irish language organisations
Irish-Australian culture
Organizations established in 1993